"Tin Machine" is the song from which the band Tin Machine took their name, a track from their debut album, also of the same name. It was released as a single in September 1989, as a double A-side with a live cover of Bob Dylan’s “Maggie's Farm”.

Song development and live performances
According to Reeves Gabrels, naming the band after the song was the idea of the Sales brothers, who reasoned "It’s like having your own theme tune".

"Maggie’s Farm" and the other live tracks were recorded at the band’s gig at La Cigale, Paris on 25 June 1989. Both songs had videos – "Tin Machine" featured in an excerpt from Julien Temple’s promotional film as a mock performance where the fans stormed the stage, leaving Bowie with a nosebleed; and "Maggie’s Farm" was recorded live. Despite this, the double-A side entered the chart at its UK No. 48 peak.

The live version of "Bus Stop" (also released as the Country version, or Live Country version) would later appear as a bonus track on 1995 Virgin Records reissue of Tin Machine.

Track listing
7" version
 "Tin Machine" (Bowie, Gabrels, Sales, Sales) – 3:34
 "Maggie's Farm" (Live) (Dylan) – 4:29

12" version
 "Tin Machine" (Bowie, Gabrels, Sales, Sales) – 3:34
 "Maggie’s Farm" (Live) (Dylan) – 4:29
 "I Can't Read" (Live) (Bowie, Gabrels) – 6:13

CD version
 "Tin Machine" (Bowie, Gabrels, Sales, Sales) – 3:34
 "Maggie's Farm" (Live) (Dylan) – 4:29
 "I Can't Read" (Live) (Bowie, Gabrels) – 6:13
 "Bus Stop" (Live) (Bowie, Gabrels) – 1:52

Credits and personnel
Producers
 Tin Machine
 Tim Palmer

Musicians
 David Bowie – vocals, guitar
 Reeves Gabrels – lead guitar
 Hunt Sales – drums, vocals
 Tony Sales – bass, vocals

Additional musicians
 Kevin Armstrong – rhythm guitar

References

Pegg, Nicholas, The Complete David Bowie, Reynolds & Hearn Ltd, 2000,

External links
 

1989 singles
Tin Machine songs
Songs written by David Bowie
Songs written by Reeves Gabrels
1989 songs
EMI Records singles
Music videos directed by Julien Temple